Tonight Tonight may refer to:
"Tonight, Tonight", a song by The Mello-Kings, 1957
"Tonight, Tonight" (The Smashing Pumpkins song), 1996
"Tonight Tonight" (Hot Chelle Rae song), 2011
"Tonight Tonight", a song by The Rasmus from the album Hell of a Tester
"Tonight Tonight", a song by Rascal Flatts from the album Nothing Like This
"Tonight Tonight", a song by John King
"Tonight Tonight", a song by Celeste from the album Not Your Muse

See also
"Tonight, Tonight, Tonight", a song by Genesis
Tonight (disambiguation)
Tonite (disambiguation)